The Way of All Flesh is a 1940 American drama film directed by Louis King and written by Lenore J. Coffee. The film stars Akim Tamiroff, Gladys George, William "Bill" Henry, Muriel Angelus, Berton Churchill and Roger Imhof. It was released on July 5, 1940 by Paramount Pictures.

The film is a remake of the lost 1927 silent film of the same name.

Plot

When a successful banker is traveling with a large amount of the bank’s cash, he becomes the victim of a robbery. shamed to return home, he disappears and becomes a derelict. Many years later, he finds himself in his old home town. He peers into the window of his own house and sees his family, now grown. His wife comes out, not recognizing her husband, and she invites him in. He thanks her but departs, walking into the darkness.

Cast 
Akim Tamiroff as Paul Kriza
Gladys George as Anna Kriza
William "Bill" Henry as Paul Kriza, Jr.
Muriel Angelus as Mary Brown
Berton Churchill as Reginald L. Morten
Roger Imhof as Franz Henzel
James Seay as Varno
Douglas Kennedy as Timothy
Norma Gene Nelson as Mitzi as a child
Tommy Bupp as Timothy as a child
June Hedin as Julie as a child
Darryl Hickman as Victor as a boy
James West as Paul, Jr. as a child
John Harmon as Pete
James Burke as Frisco
Marilyn Knowlden as Julie Kriza
John Hartley as Victor Kriza
Sheila Ryan as Mitzi Kriza
Fritz Leiber as Max
Torben Meyer as Sandor Nemzeti
Stanley Price as Lefty
Leonard Penn as Joe

References

External links 
 

1940 films
Paramount Pictures films
American drama films
1940 drama films
Films directed by Louis King
Remakes of American films
Sound film remakes of silent films
American black-and-white films
1940s English-language films
1940s American films